Accredo is a specialty pharmaceutical and service provider for patients with complex and chronic health conditions. Accredo provides specialty drugs, drugs that cost more than $600 per month, with the average being $10,000 a month, which treat serious conditions such as multiple sclerosis, rheumatoid arthritis, hemophilia and cancer. It is a wholly owned subsidiary of Express Scripts and is headquartered in Memphis.

History
Southern Health Systems (SHS), Accredo's predecessor, was founded in 1983. SHS distributed Protropin, a human growth hormone, and clotting factor. Accredo Health, Inc. was organized in 1996. The following year it acquired Southern Health Systems, Inc. (SHS) and its wholly owned subsidiary, Nova Factor, Inc. (NFI). Soon thereafter, Accredo acquired Hemophilia Health Services (HHS). In 1999, Accredo filed its IPO and became a public company, trading on NASDAQ under the ticker ACDO. In 2004, Medco Health Solutions Inc. allied with Accredo Health to form a specialty pharmacy. In June of that year, its wholly owned subsidiary, HHS acquired Hemophilia Resources of America. In August the following year, Medco acquired Accredo and it became a wholly owned subsidiary of the company. In 2012, Express Scripts acquired Medco, making Accredo a wholly owned subsidiary of Express Scripts. As a result, Accredo merged with CuraScript SP Specialty Pharmacy, operating under the name Accredo.

Accredo offers over 300 specialty drugs which are offered in 30 pharmacies nationwide.

Pharmaceuticals
Accredo's pharmacy provides infused, injectable, and oral drugs that are used to treat complex, chronic and life-threatening diseases.

Services
Accredo offers Therapeutic Resource Centers (TRCs) for specialty conditions. The conditions covered by Accredo's TRCs include bleeding disorders, cardiovascular, diabetes, Hepatitis C, HIV and Immunology, immune disorders, inflammatory conditions, Multiple Sclerosis, neuroscience, oncology, pulmonary, pulmonary hypertension and women's health. The purpose of the teams is to provide specialty drugs, ensure dosage is correct for each patient, and encourage drug compliance to reduce waste and costs for all parties. Side effect management is an important part of TRC, as side effects are a large contributor to patients not complying with their drug regimens. Pharmacists and nurses also provide patient counseling and education.

The oncology TRC includes oncology decision support tools for physicians and patients in partnership with Eviti, Inc. It is broken up into subdivisions for types of cancer to provide drug-specific support.

The company's Clinical Day Supply program addresses patient noncompliance with oral oncology drug regimens. To reduce waste as well as to monitor patient drug tolerance, Accredo gave only a half fill of prescription medications, then performed a clinical assessment to monitor patient drug tolerance and help ensure that patients do not take unnecessary or ineffective drugs. With the program, treatment options can also be reexamined if the drugs are working, but side effects are hindering quality of life.

References

External links
 Official website

Companies based in Memphis, Tennessee
Pharmacy benefit management companies based in the United States
Health care companies established in 1983
Specialty drugs
Health care companies based in Tennessee
2005 mergers and acquisitions